

Events

Pre-1600
1124 – The city of Tyre falls to the Venetian Crusade after a siege of nineteen weeks.
1456 – A retrial verdict acquits Joan of Arc of heresy 25 years after her execution.
1520 – Spanish conquistadores defeat a larger Aztec army at the Battle of Otumba.
1534 – Jacques Cartier makes his first contact with aboriginal peoples in what is now Canada.
1575 – The Raid of the Redeswire is the last major battle between England and Scotland.
1585 – The Treaty of Nemours abolishes tolerance to Protestants in France.

1601–1900
1667 – An English fleet completes the destruction of a French merchant fleet off Fort St Pierre, Martinique during the Second Anglo-Dutch War.
1770 – The Battle of Larga between the Russian Empire and the Ottoman Empire takes place.
1777 – American forces retreating from Fort Ticonderoga are defeated in the Battle of Hubbardton.
1798 – As a result of the XYZ Affair, the US Congress rescinds the Treaty of Alliance with France sparking the "Quasi-War".
1807 – The first Treaty of Tilsit between France and Russia is signed, ending hostilities between the two countries in the War of the Fourth Coalition.
1834 – In New York City, four nights of rioting against abolitionists began.
1846 – US troops occupy Monterey and Yerba Buena, thus beginning the US conquest of California.
1863 – The United States begins its first military draft; exemptions cost $300.
1865 – Four conspirators in the assassination of Abraham Lincoln are hanged.
1892 – The Katipunan is established, the discovery of which by Spanish authorities initiated the Philippine Revolution.
1898 – US President William McKinley signs the Newlands Resolution annexing Hawaii as a territory of the United States.

1901–present
1907 – Florenz Ziegfeld Jr. staged his first Follies on the roof of the New York Theater in New York City.
1911 – The United States, UK, Japan, and Russia sign the North Pacific Fur Seal Convention of 1911 banning open-water seal hunting, the first international treaty to address wildlife preservation issues.
1915 – The First Battle of the Isonzo comes to an end.
  1915   – Colombo Town Guard officer Henry Pedris is executed in British Ceylon for allegedly inciting persecution of Muslims.
1916 – The New Zealand Labour Party was founded in Wellington.
1928 – Sliced bread is sold for the first time (on the inventor's 48th birthday) by the Chillicothe Baking Company of Chillicothe, Missouri.
1930 – Industrialist Henry J. Kaiser begins construction of Boulder Dam (now known as Hoover Dam).
1937 – The Marco Polo Bridge Incident (Lugou Bridge) provides the Imperial Japanese Army with a pretext for starting the Second Sino-Japanese War (China-Japan War).
  1937   – The Peel Commission Report recommends the partition of Palestine, which was the first formal recommendation for partition in the history of Palestine.
1941 – The US occupation of Iceland replaces the UK's occupation.
1944 – World War II: Largest Banzai charge of the Pacific War at the Battle of Saipan.
1946 – Mother Francesca S. Cabrini becomes the first American to be canonized.
  1946   – Howard Hughes nearly dies when his XF-11 reconnaissance aircraft prototype crashes in a Beverly Hills neighborhood.
1952 – The ocean liner  passes Bishop Rock on her maiden voyage, breaking the transatlantic speed record to become the fastest passenger ship in the world.
1953 – Ernesto "Che" Guevara sets out on a trip through Bolivia, Peru, Ecuador, Panama, Costa Rica, Nicaragua, Honduras, and El Salvador.
1958 – US President Dwight D. Eisenhower signs the Alaska Statehood Act into law.
1959 – Venus occults the star Regulus. This rare event is used to determine the diameter of Venus and the structure of the Venusian atmosphere.
1962 – Alitalia Flight 771 crashes in Junnar, Maharashtra, India, killing 94 people.
1963 – Buddhist crisis: Police commanded by Ngô Đình Nhu, brother and chief political adviser of South Vietnam President Ngo Dinh Diem, attacked a group of American journalists who were covering a protest.
1978 – The Solomon Islands becomes independent from the United Kingdom.
1980 – Institution of sharia law in Iran.
  1980   – During the Lebanese Civil War, 83 Tiger militants are killed during what will be known as the Safra massacre.
1981 – US President Ronald Reagan nominates Sandra Day O'Connor to become the first female member of the Supreme Court of the United States.
1983 – Cold War: Samantha Smith, a US schoolgirl, flies to the Soviet Union at the invitation of Secretary General Yuri Andropov.
1985 – Boris Becker becomes the youngest male player ever to win Wimbledon at age 17.
1991 – Yugoslav Wars: The Brioni Agreement ends the ten-day independence war in Slovenia against the rest of the Socialist Federal Republic of Yugoslavia.
1992 – The New York Court of Appeals rules that women have the same right as men to go topless in public.
1997 – The Turkish Armed Forces withdraw from northern Iraq after assisting the Kurdistan Democratic Party in the Iraqi Kurdish Civil War.
2003 – NASA Opportunity rover, MER-B or Mars Exploration Rover–B, was launched into space aboard a Delta II rocket.
2005 – A series of four explosions occurs on London's transport system, killing 56 people, including four suicide bombers, and injuring over 700 others.
2007 – The first Live Earth benefit concert was held in 11 locations around the world.
2012 – At least 172 people are killed in a flash flood in the Krasnodar Krai region of Russia.
2013 – A De Havilland Otter air taxi crashes in Soldotna, Alaska, killing ten people.
2016 – Ex-US Army soldier Micah Xavier Johnson shoots fourteen policemen during an anti-police protest in downtown Dallas, Texas, killing five of them. He is subsequently killed by a robot-delivered bomb.
2019 – The United States women's national soccer team defeated the Netherlands 2–0 at the 2019 FIFA Women's World Cup Final in Lyon, France.
2022 – Boris Johnson announces his resignation as leader of the Conservative Party following days of pressure from the Members of Parliament (MPs) during the July 2022 United Kingdom government crisis.

Births

Pre-1600
 611 – Eudoxia Epiphania, daughter of Byzantine emperor Heraclius 
1053 – Emperor Shirakawa of Japan (d. 1129)
1119 – Emperor Sutoku of Japan (d. 1164)
1207 – Elizabeth of Hungary (d. 1231)
1482 – Andrzej Krzycki, Polish archbishop (d. 1537)
1528 – Archduchess Anna of Austria (d. 1590)
1540 – John Sigismund Zápolya, King of Hungary (d. 1571)
1585 – Thomas Howard, 21st Earl of Arundel, English courtier and politician, Lord Lieutenant of Northumberland (d. 1646)
1588 – Wolrad IV, Count of Waldeck-Eisenberg (d. 1640)

1601–1900
1616 – John Leverett, Governor of Massachusetts Bay Colony (d. 1679)
1752 – Joseph Marie Jacquard, French merchant, invented the Jacquard loom (d. 1834)
1766 – Guillaume Philibert Duhesme, French general (d. 1815)
1831 – Jane Elizabeth Conklin, American poet and religious writer (d. 1914)
1833 – Félicien Rops, Belgian painter and illustrator (d. 1898)
1843 – Camillo Golgi, Italian physician and pathologist, Nobel Prize laureate (d. 1926)
1846 – Heinrich Rosenthal, Estonian physician and author (d. 1916)
1848 – Francisco de Paula Rodrigues Alves, Brazilian politician, 5th President of Brazil (d. 1919)
1851 – Charles Albert Tindley, American minister and composer (d. 1933)
1855 – Ludwig Ganghofer, German author and playwright (d. 1920)
1859 – Rettamalai Srinivasan, Indian politician (d. 1945)
1860 – Gustav Mahler, Austrian composer and conductor (d. 1911)
1861 – Nettie Stevens, American geneticist (d. 1912)
1869 – Rachel Caroline Eaton, American academic (d. 1938)
  1869   – Fernande Sadler, French painter and mayor (d. 1949)
1874 – Erwin Bumke, German lawyer and jurist (d. 1945)
1880 – Otto Frederick Rohwedder, American engineer, invented sliced bread (d. 1960)
1882 – Yanka Kupala, Belarusian poet and writer (d. 1941)
1883 – Toivo Kuula, Finnish conductor and composer (d. 1918)
1884 – Lion Feuchtwanger, German author and playwright (d. 1958)
1891 – Tadamichi Kuribayashi, Japanese general and poet (d. 1945)
1891 – Virginia Rappe, American model and actress (d. 1921)
1893 – Herbert Feis, American historian and author (d. 1972)
  1893   – Miroslav Krleža, Croatian author, poet, and playwright (d. 1981)
1898 – Arnold Horween, American football player and coach (d. 1985)
1899 – George Cukor, American director and producer (d. 1983)
1900 – Maria Bard, German stage and silent film actress (d. 1944)
  1900   – Earle E. Partridge, American general (d. 1990)

1901–present
1901 – Vittorio De Sica, Italian actor and director (d. 1974)
  1901   – Sam Katzman, American director and producer (d. 1973)
  1901   – Eiji Tsuburaya, Japanese cinematographer and producer (d. 1970)
1902 – Ted Radcliffe, American baseball player and manager (d. 2005)
1904 – Simone Beck, French chef and author (d. 1991)
1905 – Marie-Louise Dubreil-Jacotin, French mathematician (d. 1972)
1906 – William Feller, Croatian-American mathematician and academic (d. 1970)
  1906   – Anton Karas, Austrian zither player and composer (d. 1985)
  1906   – Satchel Paige, American baseball player and coach (d. 1982)
1907 – Robert A. Heinlein, American science fiction writer and screenwriter (d. 1988)
1908 – Revilo P. Oliver, American author and academic (d. 1994)
1909 – Gottfried von Cramm, German tennis player (d. 1976)
1910 – Doris McCarthy, Canadian painter and author (d. 2010)
1911 – Gian Carlo Menotti, Italian-American composer (d. 2007)
1913 – Pinetop Perkins, American singer and pianist (d. 2011)
1915 – Margaret Walker, American novelist and poet (d. 1998)
1917 – Fidel Sánchez Hernández, Salvadoran general and politician, President of El Salvador (d. 2003)
  1917   – Iva Withers, Canadian-American actress and singer (d. 2014)
1918 – Bob Vanatta, American head basketball coach (d. 2016)
  1918   – Jing Shuping, Chinese businessman (d. 2009)
1919 – Jon Pertwee, English actor (d. 1996)
1921 – Ezzard Charles, American boxer (d. 1975)
  1921   – Adolf von Thadden, German lieutenant and politician (d. 1996)
1922 – Alan Armer, American director, producer, and screenwriter (d. 2010)
  1922   – James D. Hughes, American Air Force lieutenant general
1923 – Liviu Ciulei, Romanian actor, director, and screenwriter (d. 2011)
  1923   – Whitney North Seymour Jr., American politician (d. 2019)
  1923   – Eduardo Falú, Argentinian guitarist and composer (d. 2013)
1924 – Natalia Bekhtereva, Russian neuroscientist and psychologist (d. 2008)
  1924   – Karim Olowu, Nigerian sprinter and long jumper (d. 2019)
  1924   – Mary Ford, American singer and guitarist (d. 1977)
  1924   – Eddie Romero, Filipino director, producer, and screenwriter (d. 2013)
1925 – Wally Phillips, American radio host (d. 2008)
1926 – Nuon Chea, Cambodian politician (d. 2019)
  1926   – Anand Mohan Zutshi Gulzar Dehlvi, Urdu poet (d. 2020)
1927 – Alan J. Dixon, American lawyer and politician, 34th Illinois Secretary of State (d. 2014)
  1927   – Charlie Louvin, American singer-songwriter and guitarist (d. 2011) 
  1927   – Doc Severinsen, American trumpet player and conductor 
1928 – Patricia Hitchcock, English actress (d. 2021)
  1928   – Kapelwa Sikota Zambian nurse and health official (d. 2006)
1929 – Hasan Abidi, Pakistani journalist and poet (d. 2005)
  1929   – Sergio Romano, Italian writer, journalist, and historian
1930 – Biljana Plavšić, 2nd President of Republika Srpska
  1930   – Hamish MacInnes, Scottish mountaineer and author (d. 2020)
  1930   – Theodore Edgar McCarrick, American cardinal
  1930   – Hank Mobley, American saxophonist and composer (d. 1986)
1931 – David Eddings, American author and academic (d. 2009)
1932 – T. J. Bass, American physician and author (d. 2011)
  1932   – Joe Zawinul, Austrian jazz keyboardist and composer (d. 2007)
1933 – David McCullough, American historian and author (d. 2022)
1934 – Robert McNeill Alexander, British zoologist (d. 2016)
1935 – Gian Carlo Michelini, Italian-Taiwanese Roman Catholic priest
1936 – Egbert Brieskorn, German mathematician and academic (d. 2013)
  1936   – Jo Siffert, Swiss race car driver (d. 1971)
  1936   – Nikos Xilouris, Greek singer-songwriter (d. 1980)
1937 – Tung Chee-hwa, Hong Kong businessman and politician, 1st Chief Executive of Hong Kong
1938 – James Montgomery Boice, American pastor and theologian (d. 2000)
1939 – Elena Obraztsova, Russian soprano and actress (d. 2015)
1940 – Ringo Starr, English singer-songwriter, drummer, and actor 
1941 – Marco Bollesan, Italian rugby player and coach (d. 2021)
  1941   – John Fru Ndi, Cameroonian politician
  1941   – Michael Howard, Welsh lawyer and politician
  1941   – Bill Oddie, English comedian, actor, and singer
  1941   – Jim Rodford, English bass player (d. 2018)
1942 – Carmen Duncan, Australian actress (d. 2019)
  1943   – Joel Siegel, American journalist and critic (d. 2007)
1944 – Feleti Sevele, Tongan politician; Prime Minister of Tonga
  1944   – Tony Jacklin, English golfer and sportscaster
  1944   – Glenys Kinnock, Baroness Kinnock of Holyhead, English educator and politician,
  1944   – Emanuel Steward, American boxer and trainer (d. 2012)
  1944   – Ian Wilmut, English-Scottish embryologist and academic
1945 – Michael Ancram, English lawyer and politician
  1945   – Adele Goldberg, American computer scientist and academic
  1945   – Helô Pinheiro,  inspiration for the song "The Girl from Ipanema"          
1947 – Gyanendra, King of Nepal
  1947   – Howard Rheingold, American author and critic
1949 – Shelley Duvall, American actress, writer, and producer
1954 – Simon Anderson, Australian surfer
1955 – Len Barker, American baseball player and coach
1957 – Jonathan Dayton, American director and producer
  1957   – Berry Sakharof, Turkish-Israeli singer-songwriter and guitarist 
  1958   – Alexander Svinin, Russian figure skater and coach
1959 – Billy Campbell, American actor
1960 – Kevin A. Ford, American colonel and astronaut
  1960   – Ralph Sampson, American basketball player and coach
1963 – Vonda Shepard, American singer-songwriter and actress
1964 – Dominik Henzel, Czech-Swedish actor and comedian
1965 – Mo Collins, American actress, comedian and screenwriter
  1965   – Jeremy Kyle, English talk show host
1966 – Jim Gaffigan, American comedian, actor, producer, and screenwriter
1967 – Tom Kristensen, Danish race car driver
1968 – Jorja Fox, American actress 
1969 – Sylke Otto, German luger
  1969   – Joe Sakic, Canadian ice hockey player
  1969   – Cree Summer, American-Canadian actress
1970 – Wayne McCullough, Northern Irish boxer
  1970   – Min Patel, Indian-English cricketer
  1970   – Erik Zabel, German cyclist and coach
1971 – Christian Camargo, American actor, producer, and screenwriter
1972 – Lisa Leslie, American basketball player and actress
  1972   – Manfred Stohl, Austrian race car driver
  1972   – Kirsten Vangsness, American actress and writer
1973 – José Jiménez, Dominican baseball player
  1973   – Kārlis Skrastiņš, Latvian ice hockey player (d. 2011)
1974 – Patrick Lalime, Canadian ice hockey player and sportscaster
1975 – Tony Benshoof, American luger
  1975   – Louis Koen, South African rugby player
  1975   – Adam Nelson, American shot putter
1976 – Bérénice Bejo, Argentinian-French actress
  1976   – Dominic Foley, Irish footballer
  1976   – Vasily Petrenko, Russian conductor
  1976   – Ercüment Olgundeniz, Turkish discus thrower and shot putter
1978 – Chris Andersen, American basketball player
  1978   – Davor Kraljević, Croatian footballer
1979 – Ibrahim Sulayman Muhammad Arbaysh, Saudi Arabian terrorist (d. 2015)
  1979   – Anastasios Gousis, Greek sprinter
  1979   – Douglas Hondo, Zimbabwean cricketer
1980 – John Buck, American baseball player
  1980   – Serdar Kulbilge, Turkish footballer
  1980   – Michelle Kwan, American figure skater
1981 – Mahendra Singh Dhoni, Indian cricketer
1982 – Jan Laštůvka, Czech footballer
  1982   – George Owu, Ghanaian footballer
1983 – Justin Davies, Australian footballer
1984 – Minas Alozidis, Greek hurdler
  1984   – Alberto Aquilani, Italian footballer
  1984   – Mohammad Ashraful, Bangladeshi cricketer
1985 – Marc Stein, German footballer
1986 – Ana Kasparian, American journalist and producer
  1986   – Udo Schwarz, German rugby player
  1986   – Sevyn Streeter, American singer-songwriter
1988 – Kaci Brown, American singer-songwriter
  1988   – Lukas Rosenthal, German rugby player
1989 – Landon Cassill, American race car driver
  1989   – Miina Kallas, Estonian footballer
  1989   – Karl-August Tiirmaa, Estonian skier
1990 – Lee Addy, Ghanaian footballer
  1990   – Pascal Stöger, Austrian footballer
1991 – Alesso, Swedish DJ, record producer and musician 
1992 – Ellina Anissimova, Estonian hammer thrower
  1992   – Dominik Furman, Polish footballer
  1994 – Nigina Abduraimova, Uzbekistani tennis player
1994 – Timothy Cathcart, Northern Irish race car driver (d. 2014)
1997 – Mizuho Habu, Japanese idol
1999 – Moussa Diaby, French footballer

Deaths

Pre-1600
 984 – Crescentius the Elder, Italian politician and aristocrat
1021 – Fujiwara no Akimitsu, Japanese bureaucrat (b. 944)
1162 – Haakon II Sigurdsson, king of Norway (b. 1147)
1285 – Tile Kolup, German impostor claiming to be Frederick II
1304 – Benedict XI, pope of the Catholic Church (b. 1240)
1307 – Edward I, king of England (b. 1239)
1345 – Momchil, Bulgarian brigand and ruler
1531 – Tilman Riemenschneider, German sculptor (b. 1460)
1568 – William Turner, British ornithologist and botanist (b. 1508)
1572 – Sigismund II Augustus, Polish king (b. 1520)
1573 – Giacomo Barozzi da Vignola, Italian architect, designed the Church of the Gesù and Villa Farnese (b. 1507)
1593 – Mohammed Bagayogo, Malian scholar and academic (b. 1523)
1600 – Thomas Lucy, English politician (b. 1532)

1601–1900
1607 – Penelope Blount, Countess of Devonshire, English noblewoman (b. 1563)
1647 – Thomas Hooker, English minister, founded the Colony of Connecticut (b. 1586)
1701 – William Stoughton, American judge and politician, Governor of the Province of Massachusetts Bay (b. 1631)
1713 – Henry Compton, English bishop (b. 1632)
1718 – Alexei Petrovich, Russian tsarevich (b. 1690)
1730 – Olivier Levasseur, French pirate (b. 1690)
1758 – Marthanda Varma, Raja of Attingal (b. 1706)
1764 – William Pulteney, 1st Earl of Bath, English politician, Secretary at War (b. 1683)
1776 – Jeremiah Markland, English scholar and academic (b. 1693)
1790 – François Hemsterhuis, Dutch philosopher and author (b. 1721)
1816 – Richard Brinsley Sheridan, Irish playwright and poet (b. 1751)
1863 – William Mulready, Irish genre painter (b. 1786)
1865 – George Atzerodt (b. 1833)
  1865   – David Herold (b. 1842)
  1865   – Lewis Payne (b. 1844)
  1865   – Mary Surratt (b. 1823)
1890 – Henri Nestlé, German businessman, founded Nestlé (b. 1814)

1901–present
1901 – Johanna Spyri, Swiss author (b. 1827)
1913 – Edward Burd Grubb Jr., American general and diplomat, United States Ambassador to Spain (b. 1841)
1922 – Cathal Brugha, Irish revolutionary and politician, active in the Easter Rising, Irish War of Independence; first Ceann Comhairle and first President of Dáil Éireann (b. 1874)
1925 – Clarence Hudson White, American photographer and educator (b. 1871)
1927 – Gösta Mittag-Leffler, Swedish mathematician and academic (b. 1846)
1930 – Arthur Conan Doyle, British writer (b. 1859)
1932 – Alexander Grin, Russian author (b. 1880)
  1932   – Henry Eyster Jacobs, American theologian and educator (b. 1844)
1939 – Deacon White, American baseball player and manager (b. 1847)
1950 – Fats Navarro, American trumpet player and composer (b. 1923)
1955 – Ali Naci Karacan, Turkish journalist and publisher (b. 1896)
1956 – Gottfried Benn, German author and poet (b. 1886)
1960 – Francis Browne, Irish priest and photographer (b. 1880)
1964 – Lillian Copeland, American discus thrower and shot putter (b. 1904)
1965 – Moshe Sharett, Ukrainian-Israeli lieutenant and politician, 2nd Prime Minister of Israel (b. 1894)
1968 – Jo Schlesser, French race car driver (b. 1928)
1971 – Claude Gauvreau, Canadian poet and playwright (b. 1925)
1972 – Athenagoras I of Constantinople (b. 1886)
1973 – Max Horkheimer, German philosopher and sociologist (b. 1895)
  1973   – Veronica Lake, American actress (b. 1922)
1978 – Francisco Mendes, Guinea-Bissau lawyer and politician, 1st Prime Minister of Guinea-Bissau (b. 1933)
1980 – Dore Schary, American director, producer, and screenwriter (b. 1905)
1982 – Bon Maharaja, Indian guru and religious writer (b. 1901)
1984 – George Oppen, American poet and author (b. 1908)
1987 – Germaine Thyssens-Valentin, Dutch-French pianist (b. 1902)
1990 – Bill Cullen, American television panelist and game show host (b. 1920)
  1990   – Cazuza, Brazilian singer and songwriter (b. 1958)
1993 – Rıfat Ilgaz, Turkish author, poet, and educator (b. 1911)
  1993   – Mia Zapata, American singer (b. 1965)
1994 – Carlo Chiti, Italian engineer (b. 1924)
  1994   – Friedrich August Freiherr von der Heydte, German general (b. 1907)
1998 – Moshood Abiola, Nigerian businessman and politician (b. 1937)
1999 – Julie Campbell Tatham, American author (b. 1908)
1999 – Vikram Batra, Param Vir Chakra, Indian Army personnel (b. 1974)
2000 – Kenny Irwin Jr., American race car driver (b. 1969)
2001 – Fred Neil, American singer-songwriter and guitarist (b. 1936)
2003 – Izhak Graziani, Bulgarian trumpet player and conductor (b. 1924)
2006 – Syd Barrett, English singer-songwriter and guitarist (b. 1946)
  2006   – Juan de Ávalos, Spanish sculptor (b. 1911)
  2006   – John Money, New Zealand-American psychologist and author (b. 1921)
2007 – Anne McLaren, British scientist (b. 1927)
  2007   – Donald Michie, British scientist (b. 1923)
2008 – Bruce Conner, American sculptor, painter, and photographer (b. 1933)
  2008   – Dorian Leigh, American model (b. 1917)
2011 – Allan W. Eckert, American historian and author (b. 1931)
  2011   – Dick Williams, American baseball player, coach, and manager (b. 1929)
2012 – Ronaldo Cunha Lima, Brazilian poet and politician (b. 1936)
  2012   – Dennis Flemion, American drummer (b. 1955)
  2012   – Doris Neal, American baseball player (b. 1928)
  2012   – Jerry Norman, American sinologist and linguist (b. 1936)
  2012   – Leon Schlumpf, Swiss politician (b. 1927)
2013 – Artur Hajzer, Polish mountaineer (b. 1962)
  2013   – Robert Hamerton-Kelly, South African-American pastor, theologian, and author (b. 1938)
  2013   – Donald J. Irwin, American lawyer and politician, 32nd Mayor of Norwalk, Connecticut (b. 1926)
  2013   – Ben Pucci, American football player and sportscaster (b. 1925)
2014 – Alfredo Di Stéfano, Argentinian-Spanish footballer and coach (b. 1926)
  2014   – Eduard Shevardnadze, Georgian general and politician, 2nd President of Georgia (b. 1928)
  2014   – Peter Underwood, Australian lawyer and politician, 27th Governor of Tasmania (b. 1937)
2015 – Maria Barroso, Portuguese actress and politician (b. 1925)
  2015   – Bob MacKinnon, American basketball player and coach (b. 1927)
2021 – Robert Downey Sr., American actor and director. Father of Robert Downey Jr. (b. 1936)
  2021   – Jovenel Moïse, Haitian entrepreneur and politician, President of Haiti (b. 1968)
  2021   – Dilip Kumar, Indian film actor (b. 1922)

Holidays and observances
 Christian feast day:
 Æthelburh of Faremoutiers
 Felix of Nantes
 Illidius
 Job of Manyava (Ukrainian Orthodox Church)
 Willibald (Catholic Church)
 July 7 (Eastern Orthodox liturgics)
 Independence Day, celebrates the independence of Solomon Islands from the United Kingdom in 1978.
 Ivan Kupala Day (Belarus, Poland, Russia, Ukraine)
 Saba Saba Day (Tanzania)
 Tanabata (Japan)
 World Chocolate Day

References

External links

 
 
 

Days of the year
July